Brand Green is a village in Gloucestershire, England.

References

External links

Villages in Gloucestershire